Christopher John Boyle  (born 8 November 1951) is a retired Anglican bishop. He was Bishop of Northern Malawi in the Church of the Province of Central Africa (2001–2009) and the last Assistant Bishop of Leicester in the Church of England (2009–2017).

Early life and priestly career
Born and raised in Birmingham, Boyle studied at King's College London and was ordained a deacon in the Church of England in 1976. He was ordained priest a year later, one year into serving his four-year title as assistant curate at Emmanuel, Wylde Green. In 1980, Boyle became Chaplain to Hugh Montefiore, Bishop of Birmingham until 1983, when he became Rector at St Mary and St Margaret, Castle Bromwich. While in Castle Bromwich, he also served as Area Dean of Coleshill (1992–1999), Priest-in-charge at All Saints, Shard End (1996–1997) and Honorary Canon of St Philip's Cathedral, Birmingham (from 1996), until his emigration in 2001.

Episcopal career
In 2001, he became an Anglican bishop when he was consecrated Bishop of Northern Malawi, following his 2000 election to the post. He served in Africa for eight years before resigning to return to Britain – his successor as diocesan bishop was the first African bishop to serve in that role. He became Assistant Bishop of Leicester, and the first full-time stipendiary assistant bishop, acting as if a suffragan bishop, in the Diocese of Leicester, upon his installation on 6 September 2009. He retired effective 31 May 2017.

Styles
The Reverend Christopher Boyle (1976–1996)
The Reverend Canon Christopher Boyle (1996–2001)
The Right Reverend Christopher Boyle (2001–present)

References

|-

1951 births
Living people
Alumni of King's College London
Associates of King's College London
Anglican bishops of Northern Malawi
Assistant bishops of Leicester (1987–2017)
21st-century Anglican bishops in Malawi
People from Birmingham, West Midlands
21st-century Church of England bishops